Predrag Kojović (born 2 July 1965) is a Bosnian politician who has been a member of the House of Representatives since 6 December 2018.

From 2014 until 2018, Kojović was also a member of the Federal House of Representatives. He was the president of Our Party from 2015 to 2021.

Biography
Kojović, a Bosnian Serb, was born in Travnik in 1965. He graduated in 1988 at the Faculty of Law in Sarajevo. Before the Yugoslav Wars, he worked as a journalist for Yutel, and from 1991 he worked as a reporter for Reuters, covering wars in Slovenia, Croatia and Bosnia and Herzegovina. Kojović was not a member of the Army of the Republic of Bosnia and Herzegovina, but he worked as a war correspondent. Later he worked as war correspondent across the world.

In 2010, he was elected to the Sarajevo Cantonal Assembly. In 2014, Kojović was again elected to the Cantonal Assembly and also to the Federal House of Representatives. On 16 May 2015, Kojović became the new President of Our Party, succeeding Dennis Gratz. In December 2018, he became a member of the national House of Representatives. 

On 25 June 2021, Kojović surprisingly resigned from his position as the President of Our Party, stating "The reasons are of a personal nature and I sincerely hope that there will be no malicious speculations and conspiracy theories in this regard", but adding that he is staying "as a dedicated member of Our Party." However, only three days later, on 28 June, he decided to stay as the party's president until its scheduled congress in September 2021. Finally, at the party's congress, held on 4 September, Kojović was succeeded as president by Edin Forto.

Personal life
Kojović lives and works in Sarajevo, Bosnia and Herzegovina.

References

External links
Predrag Kojović. Istinomjer 
nasastranka.ba Naša stranka 
parlamentfbih.gov.ba House of Peoples of the Federation of Bosnia and Herzegovina 

1965 births
Living people
People from Travnik
Serbs of Bosnia and Herzegovina
University of Sarajevo alumni
Our Party (Bosnia and Herzegovina) politicians
Members of the House of Representatives (Bosnia and Herzegovina)